The Long Kiss Goodnight is a 1996 American action thriller film co-produced and directed by Renny Harlin, and produced by Shane Black and Stephanie Austin with screenplay written by Black. It stars Geena Davis, Samuel L. Jackson, Tom Amandes, Yvonne Zima, Brian Cox, Patrick Malahide, Craig Bierko and David Morse. The story follows an amnesiatic schoolteacher (Davis) who sets out to recover her identity with the help of a private detective (Jackson) when they discover a dark conspiracy.

Released by New Line Cinema on October 11, 1996, it grossed almost $96 million against a budget of $65 million, and gained a strong cult following.

Plot
Samantha Caine is a schoolteacher in small-town Honesdale, Pennsylvania, living with her boyfriend, Hal, and her daughter, Caitlin. Eight years earlier, she was found washed ashore on a New Jersey beach, pregnant with Caitlin and totally amnesiac. Having never remembered her real name, "Samantha" has hired a number of ineffective private investigators to discover her past, the latest being the down-on-his-luck Mitch Henessey. During the Christmas holidays, Samantha is involved in a car accident and suffers a brief concussion; when she recovers, she finds she possesses skills with a knife that she cannot explain. Shortly thereafter, the family home is broken into by "One-Eyed Jack", a convict who escaped from jail after seeing Samantha's face on television.  Samantha demonstrates her fighting prowess by killing Jack bare-handed.  Worried that she poses a danger to Hal and Caitlin, Samantha leaves with Mitch, who has found a suitcase belonging to her, to seek out answers.

The suitcase contains a note directing them to Dr. Nathan Waldman. They arrange to meet at a train station unaware that government agents are tapping the doctor's calls.  En route, Samantha discovers the bottom of the suitcase contains a disassembled sniper rifle which she can expertly reassemble, along with other weapons.  When Samantha and Mitch go to meet Waldman at the station, they are attacked by a team of agents who shoot numerous bystanders, but the two escape with Waldman's help. The doctor informs Samantha that she is really an expert CIA assassin, Charlene Elizabeth "Charly" Baltimore, who had disappeared eight years earlier.

Unsure if they can trust Waldman, Samantha and Mitch leave him behind and seek another contact named on a note in the suitcase, Luke, believing he may be Charly's fiancé.

Waldman catches up with them and tries to warn them that Luke is actually Charly's last assassination target, "Daedalus".  However, Luke kills Dr. Waldman. Samantha is then tortured for information: She is stripped down to her bra, panties, and translucent slip, bound with rope by her hands and feet to a waterwheel, and repeatedly lowered into ice cold water until near drowning. During this process, her real identity fully resurfaces.

After being tortured, she is finally jolted into remembering her past life.  Samantha frees herself, kills Luke, and escapes with Mitch.  Samantha completes her physical transformation back to Charly, cutting her hair and dying it platinum blonde.  Charly realizes that her "Samantha Caine" personality was a cover to get near to Daedalus eight years earlier.

A psychological-operations specialist named Timothy, with whom Charly once had a romantic relationship, kidnaps Caitlin.

Charly and Mitch learn about Daedalus' involvement in "Project Honeymoon", which she disrupted on her mission, resulting in One-Eyed Jack's incarceration; "Project Honeymoon" was intended to be a false flag chemical bomb detonation in Niagara Falls, planned by the CIA in an attempt to blame Islamic terrorists and secure more funding.  Charly realizes that Timothy and a new group is plotting to restage the attack, led by CIA Director Leland Perkins.  In Niagara Falls, where Timothy has taken Caitlin, he captures Mitch and Charly.  She tells Timothy that he is Caitlin's biological father and implores him not to hurt their daughter, but Timothy is ultimately unmoved, locking Charly and Caitlin in a freezer to kill them.

Charly and Caitlin break out of the freezer by detonating barrels of kerosene and then freeing Mitch, who helps Charly attack the staging area.  This forces Timothy to launch the attack early; meanwhile, Caitlin locks herself in a cage on the truck carrying the bomb.  Charly chases the truck, overpowers its driver, diverts it from a Christmas parade, and overturns it on the Niagara Falls International Bridge leading to Canada.

Charly frees Caitlin but they cannot get away from the bomb, which is about to explode, as Timothy and his agents attack them from a helicopter. Mitch suddenly arrives in a car, picking up Charly and Caitlin and entering Canada just before the bomb explodes, which kills Timothy and his forces and destroys the bridge.

In an epilogue, Charly has returned to her assumed identity of Samantha Caine, moving with Caitlin and Hal to a remote farmhouse and declining an offer from the president to join the State Department (which could imply rejoining the CIA).  Mitch enjoys the publicity attracted by his role in the crisis and is interviewed by Larry King on television about Perkins, who was indicted for treason.

Cast

In addition, Joseph McKenna plays One-Eyed Jack, while Larry King has a cameo as himself.

Production
In 1994, New Line Cinema paid a then-record million (equivalent to $ million in ) for Shane Black's script.

In an early cut of the film, Mitch Henessey died, but during a test screening an audience member shouted, "You can't kill Sam Jackson!" Harlin changed the final cut so that Jackson's character survived.

On February 27, 1996, during filming at the 127-year-old Windermere House in Ontario, Canada, a fire broke out, leaving only the stone verandah intact. There was speculation that it was caused by film lighting; however, it may have been a short circuit. When the fire started, filming was taking place on the frozen lake, with the house lighted from within to be seen in the background. It is unknown whether the fire was directly associated with filming, but the building was otherwise closed for the winter. Ironically, some of the remaining scenes there involved fire, but the real fire prevented them from being shot. The film crew helped evacuate nearby homes, but the fire did not spread beyond the  building.

Reception

Box office
Over its opening weekend, the film grossed $9,065,363 from 2,245 theaters, coming in third among films opening that weekend. It grossed $33,447,612 in the US and Canada and $62,009,149 internationally, for a worldwide gross of $95,456,761.

Renny Harlin blamed the film's poor performance on confusing advertising, but Shane Black wondered if it might have been more successful if it were about a man: 'It might have made more money, they told me, but it had to be a woman. The lead had to be female.' It has also been suggested that the film's poor advertising campaign and lukewarm critical reception may have been a carry-over effect from Renny Harlin and Geena Davis's previous collaboration, Cutthroat Island, which was released 10 months earlier and was one of the biggest box office bombs of all time.

Critical reception
The Long Kiss Goodnight received mainly positive reviews. It holds a 68% approval rating at Rotten Tomatoes based on 59 reviews, with an average rating of 6.1/10. The site's consensus states: "Smart, sharp-witted, and fueled by enjoyably over-the-top action, The Long Kiss Goodnight makes up in impact what it lacks in consistent aim." On Metacritic, the film has a score of 44 out of 100 based on reviews from 20 critics, indicating "mixed or average reviews". Audiences polled by CinemaScore gave the film a median grade of "A−" on an A+ to F scale.

Christine James from Boxoffice gave it 3 and a half out of 5 stars, calling it "a lot of fun", but believing that there were some weaknesses in the script. Roger Ebert gave it 2 and a half out of 4 stars, stating, "I admired it as an example of craftsmanship, but what a lot of time and money to spend on something of no real substance." In 2014, Time Out polled several film critics, directors, actors and stunt actors to list their top action films and The Long Kiss Goodnight placed 82nd on the list.

Samuel L. Jackson stated that The Long Kiss Goodnight was his favorite movie to watch that he was in. Of all the films he’s made, Renny Harlin said The Long Kiss Goodnight was his favorite:

"It is definitely. For me its just very simple. It's a movie that had a really good screenplay, which meant that I was able to get really good actors … It's always challenging to make a movie, but it sure makes it easier when you have a good screenplay like in that one. When you have characters that are complex, and you have good drama, and have some humour and some good action, you kind of have all the ingredients. When you have that you don't even need some crazy special effects—you just need to let the characters do their thing. It was a great experience."

Sequel
The last page of Black's original 1994 script stated that there would be a sequel called The Kiss After Lightning that never happened.

While a possible sequel was reportedly in the works in 2007, no sequel has been produced.

References

Further reading
  Pdf.

External links

 
 
 
 
 

1996 films
1996 action thriller films
1990s spy films
1990s Christmas films
American action thriller films
American Christmas films
American buddy action films
1990s English-language films
Films about kidnapping
Films about amnesia
Films about terrorism in the United States
Films directed by Renny Harlin
Films scored by Alan Silvestri
Films set in New Jersey
Films set in Pennsylvania
Films set in New York (state)
Films shot in Atlantic City, New Jersey
Films shot in Hamilton, Ontario
Films shot in Toronto
Films with screenplays by Shane Black
Girls with guns films
New Line Cinema films
1990s American films
Films about disability